Enterprise is a rural farming community in northwestern Washington County, Utah, United States.  The population was 1,711 at the 2010 census. Enterprise is home to two schools, Enterprise Elementary School (K-6) and Enterprise High School (7-12).

Activities 
Enterprise is known for hosting an annual Cornfest where the town and neighboring communities celebrate the harvest of local farmers in late August. Cornfest has been a tradition in Enterprise since 1990. The small town boasts of its freshly grown corn available at the festival and along Main Street. There is also a vintage car show, live entertainment and dancing, festival food, various shopping booths, and more. 

Several lakes near Enterprise where residents and nonresidents enjoy boating, fishing, and swimming. The mountains include ATVs and hiking trails. Enterprise is also known for having great camping and hunting grounds.

Geography 

Enterprise is about 40 miles northwest of St. George and 45 miles southwest of Cedar City

According to the United States Census Bureau, the city has a total area of 2.9 square miles (7.5 km2), all land.

Enterprise is the nearest community to Mountain Meadows.

The hillside letter E can be seen in the southwest..

The 17 November 17 1902 Pine Valley earthquake, with a maximum Mercalli intensity of VIII (Severe), destroyed almost all chimneys in Pine Valley and Santa Clara. Some building damage occurred at St. George. This event was felt in Salt Lake City.

Climate
According to the Köppen Climate Classification system, Enterprise has a semi-arid climate, abbreviated "BSk" on climate maps.

History
A post office called Enterprise has been in operation since 1899. It was settled largely by residents of the town of Hebron, later abandoned. The town was so named for the settlers' enterprising plan to find a water supply. Cattle ranchers thrived in the area, but the town needed a consistent water supply to sustain themselves and for agriculture to spread. The settlers decided to take on the ambitious project of constructing a dam. Many thought that the dam would be impossible to accomplish and left the area. The rest of the settlers began work on the dam. With a lot of work and little return, the dam was completed, and the reservoir has supported the town ever since.

Demographics

As of the census of 2000, there were 1,285 people, 378 households, and 317 families residing in the town. The population density was 441.0 people per square mile (170.5/km2). There were 454 housing units at an average density of 155.8 per square mile (60.2/km2). The racial makeup of the town was 95.25% White, 2.49% Native American, 0.23% Asian, 0.78% from other races, and 1.25% from two or more races. Hispanic or Latino of any race were 1.17% of the population.

There were 378 households, out of which 49.5% had children under the age of 18 living with them, 73.8% were married couples living together, 7.4% had a female householder with no husband present, and 16.1% were non-families. 15.1% of all households were made up of individuals, and 9.3% had someone living alone who was 65 years of age or older. The average household size was 3.40, and the average family size was 3.82.

In the town, the population was spread out, with 40.0% under 18, 8.9% from 18 to 24, 21.3% from 25 to 44, 18.0% from 45 to 64, and 11.8% who were 65 years of age or older. The median age was 26 years. For every 100 females, there were 100.8 males. For every 100 females aged 18 and over, there were 101.8 males.

The median income for a household in the town was $35,694, and the median income for a family was $38,500. Males had a median income of $31,905 versus $16,354 for females. The per capita income was $13,858. About 4.3% of families and 6.1% of the population were below the poverty line, including 4.8% of those under age 18 and 5.0% of those aged 65 or over.

Government
Mayor
Brandon Humphries

City Council
Jared Moody,
Ron Lehm,
Jed Gardner,
Jared Bollinger,
Roy Adams

City Manager
Adam Bowler

See also

 List of cities and towns in Utah

References

External links

 

Cities in Utah
Cities in Washington County, Utah
Populated places established in 1891
1891 establishments in Utah Territory